Eric Lucero (born 1977/1978) is a Minnesota politician and member of the Minnesota House of Representatives. A member of the Republican Party of Minnesota, he represents District 30B in east-central Minnesota.  Lucero was a successful litigant in an October 2020 lawsuit which prohibited Minnesota's seven-day extension for counting absentee ballots received after Election Day, which was put in during the COVID-19 emergency powers earlier in the  year.

Early life
Lucero attended Metropolitan State University, graduating with a B.A.S. and again with a B.S. He later attended the University of Minnesota, graduating with a M.B.A.

Minnesota House of Representatives
Lucero was first elected to the Minnesota House of Representatives in 2014.

Lucero spoke at a “Storm the Capitol” rally in St. Paul on January 6, 2021 whose attendees cheered the actual storming of the United States Capitol as it was unfolding at the same time.

Personal life
Lucero is married to his wife, Erum. They reside in Dayton, Minnesota.

References

External links

Rep. Eric Lucero official Minnesota House of Representatives website
Eric Lucero official campaign website
 San Francisco Chronicle

Living people
Republican Party members of the Minnesota House of Representatives
Year of birth uncertain
21st-century American politicians
American politicians of Mexican descent
Year of birth missing (living people)